Nina, the Flower Girl is a lost American 1917 silent drama film produced by D. W. Griffith through his Fine Arts Film Company and distributed by Triangle Film Corporation. The film starred Bessie Love, an up-and-coming ingenue actress. It also marked the final acting role for Elmer Clifton, who was by then moving on to directing full-time.

Plot 

Nina (Love), who is blind, makes artificial flowers. Jimmie (Clifton), a hunchback newsboy, who is also an artist, is in love with her. Nina has been deceived into thinking that Jimmie is a prince who lives in a palace. When wealthy Fred Townsend (Hadley) and his mother offer to finance a surgery to restore Nina's vision, Jimmie misunderstands and thinks that the Townsends plan to hurt Nina. He unsuccessfully tries to protect her from them, before learning of their true intentions.

Nina has the surgery and her vision is restored, but Jimmie fears that she may not love him once she realized he is not a prince. He plans to attempt suicide by falling from a high place, but instead encounters a surgeon who performs a surgery to fix his hunchback. He and Nina are reunited and are in love.

Cast

Production 
To prepare for her role as the blind girl, Love spent time at the Los Angeles Institute for the Blind.

During filming, a 6-piece orchestra played music for the actors, and real champagne was used on camera.

Release and reception 
Upon its release, it was shown with a Keystone comedy.

The film received mediocre to negative reviews. In particular, its blatant sentimentality was poorly received.

Bessie Love's performance was very well-reviewed, called "an excellent bit of unaffected acting" by one reviewer.

References

External links 

 
 
 
 
 

1917 drama films
1917 lost films
1917 films
American black-and-white films
Silent American drama films
American silent feature films
Films about blind people
Films directed by Lloyd Ingraham
Lost American films
Triangle Film Corporation films
Lost drama films
1910s American films